Choreutis chelaspis is a moth in the family Choreutidae. It was described by Edward Meyrick in 1928. It is found on the Marquesas Islands.

References

Choreutis
Moths described in 1928